[[File:MotherwellLadiesTrophyPresent.jpg|thumb|350px|Motherwell Ladies are presented with the 2018 SWPL 2 trophy by SWF, following ''the 'Wells 1–1 draw with Hearts, ]]
The 2018 Scottish Women's Premier League season was the 17th season of the SWPL, the highest division of women's football in Scotland since 2002. The league was split into two divisions of eight teams each, SWPL 1 and SWPL 2'''. 

Glasgow City had won the 2017 SWPL1 title unbeaten, their eleventh consecutive championship. After a tight title-race with Hibernian, Glasgow City successfully retained the title, on the last matchday of the 2018 season. Hamilton were relegated from SWPL 1, while the promoted team was their Lanarkshire rivals, Motherwell.

Teams

SWPL 1

SWPL 2

SWPL 1

Format
Teams play each other three times. The top team wins the championship and qualifies for the Champions League. The bottom placed team is relegated to the SWPL2 at the end of season. 

The SWPL2 plays the same format with the winning team being promoted and bottom two teams being relegated.

Standings
Teams play 21 matches each.

Results

Matches 1 to 14

Matches 15 to 21

Statistics

Top goalscorers
.

SWPL 2

Standings
Teams play 21 matches each.

Results

Matches 1 to 14

Matches 15 to 21

Awards

Monthly awards

Annual awards

References

External links
Season at soccerway.com

1
Scot
Scot
Scottish Women's Premier League seasons